Gina Hecht (born December 6, 1953) is an American actress.

Early life

Hecht was born in Houston, Texas, the daughter of stage actress Pauline Hecht, and decided to embark on a career as an actress at the age of ten. After high school she earned a degree from the University of North Carolina School of the Arts.

She is Jewish.

Career

Hecht's big break came in 1979 when she was hired for the role of Jeanie DaVinci on the successful TV series Mork & Mindy. Her first film role was in the 1982 Ron Howard movie Night Shift, alongside Henry Winkler and Michael Keaton.

In addition to a career on TV and in films, she has also worked the stage. In 2011, she appeared in Neil Simon's The Prisoner of Second Avenue alongside Jason Alexander. In 1988, she was married to writer and actor Brian Herskowitz. She has a sister, Esther, and a brother, Harold. Hecht has been recurring on General Hospital as Judge Rachel Lasser from 2015 to 2019.

Personal life
Hecht married Brian Herskowitz in 1988.

Filmography

Television
 1979–1981: Mork & Mindy as Jeanie DaVinci
 1979: Hizzonner as Melanie
 1987: Everything's Relative as Emily Cabot
 1988: HeartBeat as Patty
 1989: Baywatch: "Panic at Malibu Pier" as Gina Pomeroy
 1990: Star Trek: The Next Generation: "A Matter of Perspective" as Manua Apgar
 1992: Taking Back My Life: The Nancy Ziegenmeyer Story as Deanne
 1992–1993: Seinfeld: "The Pick", "The Shoes", "The Pilot" as Dana Foley, George's therapist
 1994: Without Warning as Barbara Shiller
 1995: Blossom : You Say Tomato as teacher
 1997: Friends as Richard's Date
 2001: Jag Past Tense as Jane Maples madwoman
 2005: Pizza My Heart as Gloria Montebello
 2009: Desperate Housewives: "The Coffee Cup" as Judge Emily Gallagher
 2009–2012: Glee: "Mash-Up", "Goodbye", "Glee, Actually" as Puck's mom
 2013: The Middle: "Life Skills" as Ms. Schaefer
 2015–19: General Hospital as Judge Rachel Lasser
 2020-Present: Dave as Carol

Film
 1982: Night Shift as Charlotte Koogle
 1985: St. Elmo's Fire as Judith
 1986: Hyper Sapien: People from Another Star as Newscaster
 1987: Unfinished Business as Vickie
 1993: Family Prayers as Arlene
 1995: One Night Stand as Cy Watson
 1998: Can I Play? as Nancy
 1999: EDtv as Party Girl
 2001: Odessa or Bust as God
 2002: Clockstoppers as Meter Maid
 2008: Seven Pounds as Dr. Briar
 2008: The Last Word as Hilde Morris
 2017: Fight Your Way Out'' as Jane Stone

References

External links

1953 births
Living people
20th-century American actresses
21st-century American actresses
Actresses from Houston
American film actresses
American television actresses
University of North Carolina School of the Arts alumni